The 1973 Toronto Argonauts finished in second place in the Eastern Conference with a 7–5–2 record. They appeared in the Eastern Semi-Final.

Offseason

Regular season

Standings

Schedule

Postseason

Awards and honors
Jim Corrigall, Defensive End, CFL All-Star
Paul Desjardins, Center, CFL All-Star

References

Toronto Argonauts seasons
1973 Canadian Football League season by team